Psofida (Greek: Ψωφίδα) is a village and a community in the municipal unit of Aroania in the southern part of Achaea, Greece. The community consists of the villages Psofida, Ano Psofida, Tripotama, Ano Tripotama, Kato Tripotama and Vasiliki. Psofida was named after the ancient Arcadian town Psophis, that was located near the present village Tripotama. It is situated near the confluence of the rivers Erymanthos, Aroanios and Seiraios, and near the tripoint of Achaea, Arcadia and Elis. It is 4 km southwest of Livartzi, 9 km east of Lampeia, 25 km southwest of Kalavryta and 45 km southeast of Patras. The Greek National Road 33 (Patras – Tripoli) passes through Tripotama.

Historical population

See also
List of settlements in Achaea

References

Populated places in Achaea